Camak is a town in Warren County, Georgia, United States. The town is located just off Interstate 20 between Atlanta and Augusta. The population was 165 at the 2000 census.

History
The Georgia General Assembly incorporated the place in 1898 as the "Town of Camak", with municipal corporate limits extending in a one-half mile radius from the Georgia Railroad depot. The community was named after James Camak, a railroad promoter. Camak's home in Athens, the Camak House, is listed on the National Register of Historic Places.

Geography

Camak is located at  (33.453039, -82.648287).

Demographics

At the 2000 census there were 165 people, 71 households, and 40 families in the town. The racial makeup of the town was 46.06% White, 53.33% African American and 0.61% Native American.
Of the 71 households, 21.1% had children under the age of 18 living with them, 43.7% were married couples living together, 12.7% had a female householder with no husband present, and 42.3% were non-families. 39.4% of households were one person and 16.9% were one person aged 65 or older. The average household size was 2.32 and the average family size was 3.15.

The age distribution was 20.0% under the age of 18, 7.9% from 18 to 24, 26.1% from 25 to 44, 29.1% from 45 to 64, and 17.0% 65 or older. The median age was 42 years. For every 100 females, there were 96.4 males. For every 100 females age 18 and over, there were 85.9 males.

The median household income was $26,500 and the median family income  was $30,833. Males had a median income of $28,000 versus $16,667 for females. The per capita income for the town was $13,594. About 16.7% of families and 19.3% of the population were below the poverty line, including 14.3% of those under the age of 18 and 25.0% of those 65 or over.

See also

 Central Savannah River Area

References

Towns in Georgia (U.S. state)
Towns in Warren County, Georgia